The Disappointment Islands are a subgroup of the Tuamotu Archipelago in French Polynesia. They are located towards the northeast, away from the main Tuamotu group.

The Disappointment Islands are a small group of coral islands, which includes the island of Tepoto and the atoll of Napuka. Puka-Puka,  to their southeast, is often included in this subgroup.

These islands are arid, and are not especially conducive to human habitation.

Demographics 
The Disappointment Islands are sparsely populated. The inhabitants are overwhelmingly native Polynesians. According to the 2002 census, the population of the islands is as follows:
 Tepoto: 54
 Napuka: 257
 Puka-Puka: 197

Administration 
Administratively Tepoto Island belongs to the commune of Napuka, while Puka-Puka has its own commune.

History

The western Disappointment Islands, Tepoto and Napuka, were colonized by voyagers from the neighboring Tuamotus, but Puka-Puka was colonized by settlers from the Marquesas Islands, several hundred kilometres to the northeast.

The first European to see these islands was Ferdinand Magellan in his 1520 expedition to the Philippines and the Spice Islands. He called them the "Unfortunate Islands" (Islas Infortunadas) because his sailors could not find a water source there from which to replenish, while en route to the Philippine Islands.

Further European contact with Napuka Atoll only took place again two centuries later, in 1765, with British explorer John Byron. He named Napuka and Tepoto "Disappointment Islands" because he found the natives to be hostile toward him. The islands were also visited by the United States Exploring Expedition in 1839.

See also 
 French Polynesia

References

External links 

 A Journey to the Disappointment Islands
 History 

Islands of the Tuamotus
Archipelagoes of the Pacific Ocean